Colombières-sur-Orb (literally Colombières on Orb) is a commune in the Hérault department in southern France.

The communal territory is home to a castle and the Gorges de Colombières, part of the Haut-Languedoc Regional Park, which includes prehistoric traces of troglodytes.

Population

See also
Communes of the Hérault department

References

Communes of Hérault
Châteaux in Hérault